Hans Rinn (born 19 March 1953 in Langewiesen, Bezirk Suhl) is an East German former luger who competed from the early 1970s to the early 1980s. He won three medals at the Winter Olympics, including two gold (doubles: 1976, 1980) and one bronze (singles: 1976).

Rinn also won eight medals at the FIL World Luge Championships with four golds (singles: 1973, 1977, doubles: 1975, 1977), three silvers (singles: 1974, doubles: 1973, 1979), and one bronze (1978).

At the FIL European Luge Championships, Rinn won 13 medals. This included seven golds (Men's singles: 1973, 1974, 1979; Men's doubles: 1973, 1975, 1978, 1980), six silvers (Men's singles: 1977, 1978; Men's doubles: 1974, 1977, 1979, 1982), and one bronze (Men's singles: 1975).

Rinn was inducted into the International Luge Federation Hall of Fame in 2005 along with Josef Feistmantl.

References

DatabaseOlympics.com profile on Rinn.
FIL-Luge.org March 14, 2005 article on the new FIL Hall of Fame, including Rinn's induction. - accessed 8 March 2008.
Fuzilogik Sports - Winter Olympic results - Men's luge
Hickoksports.com results on Olympic champions in luge and skeleton.
Hickok sports information on World champions in luge and skeleton.

1953 births
Living people
People from Langewiesen
People from Bezirk Suhl
German male lugers
Sportspeople from Thuringia
Olympic lugers of East Germany
Lugers at the 1976 Winter Olympics
Lugers at the 1980 Winter Olympics
Olympic gold medalists for East Germany
Olympic bronze medalists for East Germany
Olympic medalists in luge
Medalists at the 1976 Winter Olympics
Medalists at the 1980 Winter Olympics
Recipients of the Patriotic Order of Merit in silver